Shen Jilan (29 December 1929 – 28 June 2020) was a Chinese politician affiliated with the Chinese Communist Party and was a former farmer. She held numerous governance positions and was elected to the 1st National People's Congress in 1954, and went on to be re-elected for all subsequent sittings of the National People's Congress over the next 65 years, the only person with this distinction. This has led to some commentators calling her the world's longest-serving congresswoman.

Biography 
Shen was born in Pingshun County, Shanxi, on 29 December 1929. Her father, Song Jinshui, died early. In 1934, her mother, Wu Quanxiang, remarried to Shen Hengtai, a doctor in Pingshun County. Shen Jilan grew up in Pingshun County. In 1943, she responded to a call by Mao Zedong and the Central Committee of the Chinese Communist Party to establish party organisation in Xigou village alongside Li Shunda. Together with other farming families, she established a local agricultural labour mutual aid group and defence force. The success of this local cooperative allowed Shen to rise to prominence within the Party in the 1950s.

In 1952, she was encouraged by higher powers in the Communist Party to widen the cooperative to cover 26 individual farms – the first production cooperative to be established in the People's Republic of China. On the establishment of this wider cooperative Jilan was elected deputy president. She established a working women's group to carry out agricultural work.

In 1954, she proposed the addition of the equal pay for equal work clause in the first constitution of China to reduce the gender pay gap, and her proposal was adopted. She commented in a 2018 interview: "Men got 10 work points a day, but we only got a maximum of five points no matter how much work we did." To highlight the unfairness in this approach, she organised a manuring contest between the male and female workers, which the female workers won.

In 1953, Shen joined the Chinese Communist Party and gained widespread media attention due to the success of the farming cooperative. She was elected to the 1st National People's Congress in 1954 as one of four female representatives from Shanxi province. Of the 1,226 deputies to attend the first congress, only 147 were women. She was the only person to have been elected to every session of the National People's Congress, having been returned to the 13th National People's Congress in 2018.

In 1973, Shen became director of the Shanxi Women's Federation, a position she held for ten years, before returning to her home village of Xigou in 1983. During this period, China was establishing a market economy and Shen established herself as an entrepreneur in the local economy. She helped establish a ferroalloy plant, walnut oil factory, and cannery in the local area. She was also an integral part of a reforestation plan in Xigou.

In 2008, she was chosen as an Olympic torch carrier as part of the buildup to the 2008 Summer Olympics. It was reported by local media that she donated 10,000 Chinese yuan to the 2008 Sichuan earthquake relief efforts. When her calls for widespread internet regulation in 2013 met with controversy, Shen suggested that she did not "follow the trends among the young", but argued that displaying different points of view are a benefit of the National People's Congress system. In 2019, she was awarded the highest order of honour in China, the Medal of the Republic. There is a museum dedicated to Jilan's life in Xigou.

She was considered a somewhat controversial figure by democracy activists given the fact she never voted against the party. These activists criticised her voting in favour of the Hong Kong national security law in 2020.

She died on 28 June 2020, at the age of 90, from stomach cancer.

Personal life
Shen was married to Zhang Hailiang, a veteran of the Korean War who later became director of Changzhi Municipal Urban Construction Bureau. The couple had one son and two daughters. In order of birth: Zhang Lizhen (director of a military hospital in Handan), Zhang Jiangping (Party chief of Changzhi Municipal Food Bureau), and Zhang Jiang'e (staff member of Changzhi Municipal Engineering Division).

References 

1929 births
2020 deaths
Chinese women in politics
All-China Women's Federation people
Chinese Communist Party politicians from Shanxi
Politicians from Changzhi
Delegates to the 1st National People's Congress
Delegates to the 2nd National People's Congress
Delegates to the 3rd National People's Congress
Delegates to the 4th National People's Congress
Delegates to the 5th National People's Congress
Delegates to the 6th National People's Congress
Delegates to the 7th National People's Congress
Delegates to the 8th National People's Congress
Delegates to the 9th National People's Congress
Delegates to the 10th National People's Congress
Delegates to the 11th National People's Congress
Delegates to the 12th National People's Congress
Delegates to the 13th National People's Congress
Deaths from stomach cancer
Recipients of the Order of the Republic (China)
Deaths from cancer in the People's Republic of China
Female members of the National People's Congress